Extinct is a 2021 computer-animated science fiction comedy film directed by David Silverman, and co-directed by Raymond S. Persi, from a screenplay by Joel Cohen, John Frink, and Rob LaZebnik. It features the voices of Rachel Bloom, Adam Devine, Zazie Beetz, Ken Jeong, Catherine O'Hara, Benedict Wong, Reggie Watts, and Jim Jefferies in a story following two flummels, an extinct bunny-like species with giant holes in the center, that find themselves transported from their island home in the year 1835 to modern day Shanghai.

Extinct was released in Russia on February 11, 2021, then theatrically by Sky Cinema in the United Kingdom on August 20, 2021, and then was released worldwide on Netflix on November 19, 2021.

Plot 

Op and Ed are two flummels, fluffy bunny-like creatures with giant holes in their center who are native to the Galápagos Islands. The siblings are ostracized by their community, due to Op's proneness to disaster. Just before Charles Darwin discovers their island during one of his voyages, Op and Ed find and fall into a large flower that teleports them to modern-day Shanghai, where they meet and befriend a white poodle named Clarance. The siblings learn their species is now extinct after Darwin found the island destroyed by a volcanic eruption.

Clarance brings them to the Time Terminal, a pavilion where Clarance's owner, Dr. Lee Chung, kept and studied the flowers and their seeds, which have time-traveling properties. Op accidentally knocks some seeds out, causing the Terminal to malfunction and sending Clarance to 1915 Antarctica, along with the seed that leads the flummels home. In Antarctica, Clarance is captured by Ernest Shackleton's expedition team. With the help of the Extinctables — a team of extinct animals composed of Dottie, a dodo-bird; Burnie, a Tasmanian thylacine; Alma, a female Macrauchenia; and Hoss, a male Triceratops, who were bought by Dr. Chung to the Terminal — Op and Ed travel through each seed in order to find the one that can bring them home and rescue Clarance.

Following a falling out with Ed, Op returns to the flummels' time, where she attempts to warn the rest of the flummels about the volcano. Clarance imprisons her, telling her that flummels ruined his life and that he is actually behind their extinction. Clarance had been adopted by Dr. Chung, but after Dr. Chung was charmed by the adorable flummels, Clarance went Maverick, pushing Dr. Chung into one of the flowers and destroying the seed that would send him back. He then caused the flummels' extinction by planting a drone bomb. Following Ed's arrival after seeing the video Op made, they make several attempts to escape and stop the bomb, eventually deploying a seed to move the entire island into the present day. Clarance survives, but Dr. Chung arrives and sends him back to 1915 Antarctica, thanking the flummels and the Extinctables.

A year later, Op and Ed are finally accepted by their community, while Dottie surprises Ed by laying a blueish egg shaped like a flummel. The egg hatches, but the creature inside the egg is unknown.

In a mid-credits scene, Op surprises Ed by pulling Wally into the Time Terminal. Wally exclaims that they have so much to talk about, while Op leaves to "get him a glass of water".

Cast 
 Adam DeVine – Edward "Ed" Flummel, a grumpy male grey flummel. He is Op's brother.
 Rachel Bloom – Oppy "Op" Flummel, a happy-go-lucky female brown and cream-coloured flummel. She is Ed's sister.
 Zazie Beetz – Dottie, a dodo-bird who is the leader of The Extinctables. She is Ed's love interest.
 Ken Jeong – Clarance, a white poodle dressed in a red sweater. He is an arch-enemy of Op and Ed.
 Benedict Wong – Dr. Lee Chung
 Jim Jefferies – Burnie, a thylacine ("Tasmanian tiger") who is a member of the Extinctables.
 Catherine O'Hara – Alma, a female Macrauchenia who is a member of the Extinctables.
 Reggie Watts – Hoss, a male Triceratops who is a member of the Extinctables / Ernest Shackleton.
 Nick Frost – Captain Robert FitzRoy, captain of HMS Beagle.
 Tom Hollander – Charles Darwin
 Henry Winkler – Jepson, a large, grey male flummel.
 Alex Borstein – Mali, a female brown flummel.
 Richard Kind – Wally, a talkative blue whale.
 Jon Lovitz – Conch
 Sydney Malmberg Liu – Bo
 Maria Bamford – Bo's Mom
 Raymond S. Persi – That Guy / Booby, a blue-footed booby-bird.
 Terry Gross – Bomb (voice)
 David Silverman – Cyclops / Donut-Store Clerk.
 Kelly Hu – News Reporter
 Tom Kenny – Wolfgang Amadeus Mozart
 Jason Hightower – Narrator

Production 
The film was first announced on September 3, 2019, as a new animated feature in production at Cinesite Animation directed by David Silverman with Raymond S. Persi as co-director. The announcement revealed Adam DeVine, Rachel Bloom, Zazie Beetz and Ken Jeong as cast members.

Release 
The film was released in the United Kingdom in August 20, 2021 by Sky Cinema. The film was also released in Russia theatrically on February 11, 2021. The film was released worldwide on Netflix on November 19, 2021. Extinct was in the Top 10 most watched English films on Netflix during the first week of its release.

Critical reception 
Review aggregator Rotten Tomatoes reported a score of 43% based on seven reviews, with an average rating of 4.90/10. Steve Rose for The Guardian gave the film 2 out of 5 stars, writing that: "In the Darwinian world of kids' entertainment, Extinct looks like an evolutionary dead end."

References

External links 
 
 

Canadian animated feature films
Animated films about time travel
2021 films
2021 computer-animated films
Films set in 1835
Films set in 1915
Films set in Antarctica
Films set on the Galápagos Islands
Films set in Shanghai
Cultural depictions of Charles Darwin
Films directed by David Silverman
Films scored by Michael Giacchino
Chinese animated fantasy films
Chinese computer-animated films
American adventure comedy films
Animated films about animals
Dodo
2020s Canadian films
2020s American films